Keepod is a $7 PC product by the company Keepod Ltd, headquartered in London, UK, focused on bringing personal computing to students in low-income communities all over the world. Keepod was founded in 2014 by Nissan Bahar and Franky Imbesi as a startup company, with initial funding from an Indiegogo crowdfunding campaign.

Keepod has received praise, including the Excellence Award at the China Global AI and Big Data competition in 2019. It has been greatly covered by the media with in-depth stories by BBC Click, Forbes and El Mundo as one of the possible solutions to bridge the global digital divide, and it has launched awareness collaborations with artists such as musician Robert Del Naja and supermodel Crystal Renn.

Concept 

In the core approach of Keepod, each student gets a modern PC environment (ChromiumOS) on a simple and affordable Keepod USB stick. This student can then boot on repurposed laptops that are deployed in shared spaces such as classrooms and community centres. 

With Keepod, recycled PCs are shared personally among many, removing the need for each student to have an individual computer. The Keepod product is low cost (the $7 PC) and designed to be easily replaceable. 

The concept behind this can be compared to that of a public bus. Not everyone can have an individual car, but many can use the bus, all with their own destination. Because of this, the Keepod can be utilized with education, especially in locations that cannot afford the higher costs of individual computers for each student. 

Keepod is attempting to equalize the many inconsistencies in education between countries, by targeting low budget areas in order to increase the supplies available for education. Keepod works closely with NGOs, around the world to identify and serve projects.

Impact 

The majority of people around the world still do not have access to personal computing. Many of the current efforts to bridge the digital divide are failing and it is difficult for organizations to make a dent in this large demand. The idea of providing a “laptop per child” sounds feasible in theory, but there is merely not enough funding to do so. Other initiatives to provide students with mobile devices, such as cell phones and tablets, are struggling to provide a fulfilling educational experience, especially if students aspire to go into the professional world. The distribution of relatively expensive mobile devices can pose a danger to many students in low income communities throughout the world, as children become potential targets of crime.

Keepod attempts to amend these computing issues with a $7 fix. The Keepod perspective is that the software makes the computer personal; not the physical hardware. Therefore, the Keepod USB carries the user OS and settings that can be then started on any shared computer. 

It can be assumed that the price of Keepod is generally lower than other market solutions. This is drawn because of the low starting price & the low cost of maintenance for the Keepod device. The company’s approach is that because of its low cost, if the device malfunctions, it can simply be replaced.

Due to the low cost of the device, students in impoverished areas are able to walk freely with it, addressing personal safety concerns raised when children carry expensive electronics. 

The company collaborates with both NGO & Government projects and is reported to be used in over 25 countries.

History 

Bahar and Imbesi initially met and formed a friendship at a Sonic Youth concert, in Milan. The two remained in touch, continuing to work together. The Keepod product began as an enterprise-class cyber security solution created by Bahar and Imbesi. The creators soon realised how beneficial the product could be to bridge the digital divide in low-income communities, which is when the company switched to focus on education. Bahar and Imbesi traveled to different areas around the world to learn the flaws in the other methods of trying to give underdeveloped communities access to technology and gradually built the Keepod product based on their experience.

Technology 

The Keepod device requires a host computer to start on. These computers can be shared by many people, decreasing the cost while increasing the number of individuals that benefit from the product. Once the Keepod is plugged into the USB port, the computer is powered with the users OS, becoming his or her own personal computer.

The Keepod device is secure & password protected (Advanced Encryption Standard 256). Once removed there is no footprint left behind on the actual computer hardware, protecting personal information and preventing common PC software technical malfunctions.

The Keepod USB device based on high capacity NAND Flash memory, USB 3.0 interface and waterproof housing. Currently the company offers 8GB and 16GB storage capacities.  

The Keepod devices was integrated with educational software platforms further supplementing the environment for learning. 

The Keepod system requirements for PCs are:

- PC with Intel core x64 processor (2010 and later)
- 2GB RAM
- Integrated Graphics card (min 1024×768 resolution)
- USB port 2.0 or higher
- BIOS with USB boot access
- Internet connection required for activation

Reception 

Keepod has received several awards, including the Techcode Israel Innovation Center Award in 2019.

In 2014, BBC described Keepod as “the possible solution to bridging the digital divide”. BBC did an article describing the early stages of the company and future plans for expansion. The article compiled information about countries that Keepod had begun working with, specifically describing a recent project in Kenya. Since then,  Keepod has expanded its product to a number of other underdeveloped countries. 

Keepod Ltd was also featured in 2014, by WIRED for Top Tech under £5. Franky Imbesi presented and won an award for this competition. At this event, Franky was also presented an award, as a Top Businessman Under 35. 

Keepod was discussed by Forbes in 2015 and described as a device that has gone “back to the future”, helping to connect slums to the Internet. Forbes also described Keepod as a “simple concept”, essential for “leveling the playing field”, within education and the digital divide overall. 

In 2016, BBC featured Keepod in an article and explained that many of the school conditions are not suitable for learning, but the Keepod acts as an opportunity for improving the setting. 

In 2017, The Culture Trip listed Keepod as one of the 10 Tel Aviv Startups to Watch out for. The website described Keepod as having the ability to “breathe new life into your old PC or notebook”, explaining the project's significance.

References

Indiegogo projects